Mosman Park is a suburb of Charters Towers in the Charters Towers Region, Queensland, Australia. In the  Mosman Park had a population of 375 people.

History
The suburb takes its name from Hugh Mosman, one of the prospectors who found gold at Charters Towers in December 1871.

In the 2011 census, Mosman Park had a population of 330 people.

In the  Mosman Park had a population of 375 people.

Education
There are no schools in Mosman Park. The nearest primary schools are Millchester State School in neighbouring Millchester to the east and Charters Towers Central State School in neighbouring Charters Towers City to the north. The nearest secondary school is Charters Towers State High School in Charters Towers City.

References

External links 
 

Suburbs of Charters Towers
Mosman family